The Latvian Cup was a national ice hockey cup competition in Latvia, the second after the Latvian Hockey Higher League. It was held in 1995, 1999, 2007, 2008 and from 2015 to 2018. HK Liepājas Metalurgs won three of the four cups contested.

The competition was once again discontinued after the 2017/18 edition.

Champions
1995: Pārdaugava Rīga
1999: HK Liepājas Metalurgs
2007: HK Liepājas Metalurgs
2008: HK Liepājas Metalurgs
2015/16: HK Mogo
2016/17: HK Mogo
2017/18: HK Mogo

References

External links
Latvian Ice Hockey Federation

cup
National ice hockey cup competitions in Europe